Ernst Karl Heinrich Hofmann (7 December 1880 – 27 April 1945) was a German stage and film actor.

Selected filmography
 The White Roses (1916)
 Dr. Hart's Diary (1917)
 Countess Kitchenmaid (1918)
 Ikarus, the Flying Man (1918)
 The Mistress of the World (1919)
 The Boy in Blue (1919)
 The Spinning Ball (1919)
 Algol (1920)
 Intrigue (1920)
 Satan (1920)
 The Red Poster (1920)
 Fanny Elssler (1920)
 About the Son (1921)
 Trix, the Romance of a Millionairess (1921)
 Memoirs of a Film Actress (1921)
 Off the Rails (1921)
 Miss Beryll (1921)
 The Inheritance of Tordis (1921)
 Parisian Women (1921)
 Man Overboard (1921)
 Louise de Lavallière (1922)
 The Call of Destiny (1922)
 Circus People (1922)
 Shadows of the Past (1922)
 The Golden Net (1922)
 The Big Shot (1922)
 Marie Antoinette, the Love of a King (1922)
 Lyda Ssanin (1923)
 The Fifth Street (1923)
 Jimmy: The Tale of a Girl and Her Bear (1923)
 Die Fledermaus (1923)
 Gobseck (1924)
 Lord Reginald's Derby Ride (1924)
 The Four Marriages of Matthias Merenus (1924)
 Express Train of Love (1925)
 The Morals of the Alley (1925)
 The Motorist Bride (1925)
 In the Valleys of the Southern Rhine (1925)
 Chaste Susanne (1926)
 The Adventurers (1926)
 The Woman's Crusade (1926)
 Always Be True and Faithful (1927)
 U-9 Weddigen (1927)
 Adam and Eve (1928)
 The Last Performance of the Circus Wolfson (1928)
 A Woman Branded (1931)
 Playing with Fire (1934)

Bibliography

External links

1880 births
1945 deaths
People from the Province of Silesia
Actors from Wrocław
German male stage actors
German male film actors
German male silent film actors
Male actors from Berlin
20th-century German male actors
German civilians killed in World War II